Mariela Carla Scarone (born 4 October 1986) is an Argentine field hockey player. At the 2012 Summer Olympics, she competed for the Argentina women's national field hockey team in the women's event and won the silver medal. Mariela has also won the World Cup in 2010, the bronze medal in the World Cup 2014, four Champions Trophy (2009, 2010, 2012, 2014), silver medal in 2011, the silver medal at the 2011 Pan American Games and the gold medal at the Pan American Cup in 2013.

References

External links 
 

1986 births
Argentine people of Italian descent
Living people
Argentine female field hockey players
Olympic field hockey players of Argentina
Field hockey players at the 2012 Summer Olympics
Olympic medalists in field hockey
Las Leonas players
Olympic silver medalists for Argentina
Medalists at the 2012 Summer Olympics
Pan American Games silver medalists for Argentina
Pan American Games medalists in field hockey
Field hockey players at the 2011 Pan American Games
Medalists at the 2011 Pan American Games
Field hockey players from Buenos Aires